Cyril Brun (born 22 August 1981) is a French former competitive figure skater. He won two medals on the 1999–2000 ISU Junior Grand Prix series and qualified for the JGP Final, where he placed 8th. It would be nine years before another French skater qualified for a JGP Final in men's singles. Brun was selected to represent France at two World Junior Championships and qualified for the free skate both times; he finished 14th in 2000 (Oberstdorf) and 9th in 2001 (Sofia).

Competitive highlights 
JGP: Junior Grand Prix

References 

1981 births
French male single skaters
Living people
Sportspeople from Tours, France